Golus nationalism (Yiddish: גלות נאַציאָנאַליזם Golus natsionalizm after golus), or Diaspora Nationalism, is a national movement of the Jewish people that argues for furthering Jewish national and cultural life in the large Jewish centers throughout the world, while at the same time seeking recognition for a Jewish national identity from world powers. The term golus has been understood both to mean diaspora, as well as exile.

Origins 
Golus Nationalism was conceived by Nathan Birnbaum, the Austrian philosopher who had given Zionism its name. Although Birnbaum was an early theorist of Zionism and participated in the First Zionist Congress (1897), he broke with the movement shortly after. Birnbaum began to develop a theory of pan-Judaism (Alljudentum), which embraced Jewish life in the Diaspora.

Birnbaum was opposed to the idea that Jewish assimilation was inevitable, inspired by the Jews of Eastern Europe, who had retained Yiddish as a language, had a robust folk culture, and banded together in recognizably distinct communities.

Seeking recognition for Jewish nationality 
Birnbaum made several attempts to have a Jewish national identity recognized by state powers. In 1907, he unsuccessfully advocated for Yiddish to be included as a Jewish national language in the Austro-Hungarian census. The following year, he ran a campaign for a seat in Parliament; despite his successful campaign, he failed to take his seat owing to local government corruption. In 1910, he again attempted to have Yiddish recognized. Birnbaum felt that if he could get state recognition for elements of Jewish nationhood, he could petition for Jews to have shared control of a province in Galicia. He was encouraged by the fact that the Austro-Hungarian Empire was offering the possibility of autonomous regions to ethnic groups and nationalities.

Birnbaum also propagandized on behalf of Yiddish as a language, coining the words "Yiddishism" and "Yiddishist." He organized Yiddish events in Vienna, translate Yiddish authors into German, and in 1905 established a student organization for the furtherance of the language called Yidishe Kultur. In 1908, he organized an international conference on the Yiddish language in Czernowitz, in which different Jewish factions squared off as to whether Yiddish should be declared the official language of Jewish nationalism or instead one of several Jewish languages.

Influence 
Golus nationalism prefigured a variety of attempts to reconcile Jewish identity with the experience of diaspora. Rabbi Mordecai M. Kaplan would wrestle with similar themes, developing a theory that Judaism should be seen as a civilization, rather than a religion, and founding Reconstructionist Judaism on this theory. Yiddishist Abraham Golomb wrote frequently about maintaining a Jewish identity in the Diaspora, and the centrality of Yiddish and Hebrew in this pursuit.

References

Jewish movements
Political movements
Religion and politics
Jewish diaspora
Jewish nationalism
Diaspora studies